The Sou'wester 42/43 is an American sailboat that was designed by McCurdy & Rhodes as a cruiser and first built in 1982.

The design was developed into the racing Hinckley 42 Competition and the Hinckley 43 (McCurdy & Rhodes).

Production
The design was built by Hinckley Yachts in the United States from 1982 until 2006, but it is now out of production.

Design
The Sou'wester 42/43 is a recreational keelboat, built predominantly of fiberglass, with wood trim. It has a masthead sloop rig, a raked stem, a raised counter reverse transom, a skeg-mounted rudder controlled by a wheel and a fixed fin keel or optional shoal draft keel. It displaces  and carries  of lead ballast.

The design was built on a custom basis and details varied greatly, including the keel and rudder configurations and the transom design. The designation indicates that some were built as 42s and some as 43s, mostly depending on transom configuration and resulting length overall. An improved Mark II version was introduced in 1995.

The design has sleeping accommodation for seven people, with a double "V"-berth in the bow cabin, a main cabin "U"-shaped settee with a drop-down dinette table, that forms a double berth, an additional pilot berth on the starboard side of the main cabin and an aft cabin with a double berth. The galley is located on the port side just forward of the companionway ladder. The galley is "U"-shaped and is equipped with a three-burner stove, an ice box and a double sink. A navigation station is opposite the galley, on the starboard side. The head is located just aft of the bow cabin on the port side and includes a shower.

See also
List of sailing boat types

References

External links
Photo of a Sou'wester 42/43

Keelboats
1980s sailboat type designs
Sailing yachts
Sailboat type designs by McCurdy & Rhodes
Sailboat types built by Hinckley Yachts